Shane Peacock may refer to:

 Shane Peacock (writer) (born 1957), Canadian novelist
 Shane Peacock (ice hockey) (born 1973), Canadian ice hockey player
 Shane Peacock (fashion designer), Indian fashion designer and judge of the Femina Miss India 2019 pageant